The twelfth season of the Australian competitive cooking competition show My Kitchen Rules, with the motto Share the love,  premiered on the Seven Network on 7 August 2022.

Applications for contestants opened during the airing of the end of 2021, after a one-year break in 2021. In December 2021, Feildel was announced to be returning as a judge. In April 2022, it was announced Nigella Lawson and Matt Preston will be joining the series as judges alongside Feildel with Colin Fassnidge and Curtis Stone appearing as guest judges. Although not previously announced, Gary Mehigan will also be a guest judge.

The start date for the season was confirmed as 7 August 2022, after the Commonwealth Games.

Format changes

Judges - This season, Manu Feildel is the series judge alongside Nigella Lawson or Matt Preston in the Instant Restaurant Rounds, with Colin Fassnidge, Gary Mehigan and Curtis Stone appearing as guest judges in the Final Week.
Rules - This season, the rules returned to the MKR's original format, without houses divided as seen in MKR: The Rivals version and it will be States vs States.
 Instant Restaurant Round - The format is like the original Instant Restaurant Round. However, there is a twist this season: The highest scoring team at the end of the round will advance directly to the Semi Final, while the lowest scoring team will be eliminated.
 Last Chance Cook Off - The rest 4 teams from each Instant Restaurant group have to plate a main and a dessert for Colin, Curtis, Gary as well as the other group in this round. The winning team will be decided by the judge and will be advanced to the Semi-Final, while the other 3 will be eliminated.
 Semi-Final - Instead of the previous format where there will be two Semi-finals to choose the Grand Finalist, this season only had one with two rounds to eliminate two out of four teams to decide the finalists.

Teams

Elimination history

Competition details

Instant Restaurants
During the Instant Restaurant rounds, each team hosts a three-course dinner for judges and fellow teams in their allocated group. They are scored and ranked among their group. The highest scoring team at the end of the round will advance directly to the Semi Final, while the lowest scoring team will be eliminated.

Round 1
 Episodes 1 to 6
 Airdate — 7 August to 15 August
 Description — The first of the two instant restaurant groups are introduced into the competition in Round 1, with the entrance of new judge: Nigella Lawson. The highest scoring team at the end of the round will advance directly to the Semi Final, while the lowest scoring team will be eliminated.

Note
 Due to medical problems, Mat cannot attend the Instant Restaurants in these episodes so Ashlee is the only one to represent the team and judge other teams' meal.

Round 2
 Episodes 7 to 12
 Airdate — 16 August to 24 August
 Description — The second of the two instant restaurant groups are introduced into the competition in Round 2, with the entrance of new judge: Matt Preston. The highest scoring team at the end of the round will advance directly to the Semi Final, while the lowest scoring team will be eliminated.

Last Chance Cook Off

Round 1
 Episodes 13
 Airdate — 28 August
 Description — The remaining teams from the first Instant Restaurant Round have to prepare a main and a dessert for the two judges Curtis Stone and Colin Fassnidge as well as members of group 2. After the round, the judges will decide the winning team to join Mary and Kate and Sophie and Katherine in the Semi-Final.

Round 2
 Episodes 14
 Airdate — 29 August
 Description — The remaining teams from the second Instant Restaurant Round have to prepare a main and a dessert for the two judges Gary Mehigan and Colin Fassnidge as well as members of group 1. After the round, the judges will decide the winning team to join Mary and Kate, Sophie and Katherine and Janelle and Monzir in the Semi-Final.

Semi-final
 Episodes 15
 Airdate — 30 August
 Description — The remaining teams had first to prepare an entree, however the team with the worst entree was eliminated, leaving the remaining three teams to create a main and a dessert for the two judges Manu Feildel and Curtis Stone. The top two teams with the best main and dessert were sent to the Grand Final.

Grand Finale
 Episodes 16
 Airdate — 31 August
 Description — Janelle & Monzir took on Kate & Mary in this Grand Final. They had to cook a four-course meal for the judges, the eliminated teams and their family and friends, 25 plates per course. The judges including Manu, Colin and Curtis scored each set of 4 meals out of 10 for the final verdict.

Ratings
 Colour Key:
  – Highest Rating
  – Lowest Rating
  – Elimination Episode
  – Finals Week

Notes

References

External links 
 
My Kitchen Rules on 7plus

2022 Australian television seasons
My Kitchen Rules